Talmensky District is an administrative and municipal district (raion), one of the fifty-nine in Altai Krai, Russia. It is located in the north of the krai. Its administrative center is the urban locality (a work settlement) of Talmenka. Population:  The population of Talmenka accounts for 40.2% of the district's total population.

References

Notes

Sources

Districts of Altai Krai